William James Granger was Dean of Nassau from 1971 until 1980.

Granger was educated at Codrington College and ordained in 1950. After  a curacy at St Agnes, Nassau he was the incumbent on Cat Island from 1950 until 1961; and Chaplain at Her Majesty's Prison Fox Hill, Nassau from 1961 until his time as Dean.

References

Deans of Nassau
1891 births
Alumni of Codrington College
Year of death missing
People from Cat Island, Bahamas